William Okes Parish (called "Archdeacon Okes Parish" – so either Okes was his given name or he used Okes-Parish as a surname) was  Archdeacon of Dorset from 1929 to 1936.

Born into an ecclesiastical family  on 26 June 1859, he was educated at Peterhouse, Cambridge and ordained in 1884. He was Vicar of Longfleet from  1886 to 1929; Rural Dean of Poole  from 1893 to 1929; and a Canon Residentiary of Salisbury Cathedral from 1929 to 1936. He was also a Chaplain to the Dorset Regiment.

He died on 7 April 1940.

Notes

1859 births
Alumni of Peterhouse, Cambridge
Archdeacons of Dorset
1940 deaths